Thorndon Friars is a grade II listed building in Dury Road, Monken Hadley, London Borough of Barnet, England. The house dates from the early 1700s.

References

External links

Grade II listed buildings in the London Borough of Barnet
Houses in the London Borough of Barnet
Monken Hadley